Duel at the Rio Grande is a 1963 Italian/French/Spanish co-production film starring Sean Flynn. The film is loosely based on The Mark of Zorro. It was produced by Harry Joe Brown.

It is also known as Il Segno di Zorro (The Sign Of Zorro).

Plot
Ramon Martinez y Rayol, a half Basque/half Castilian caballero leaves his native Spain for Mexico at the request of his mother. She tells him that the father he was told was dead, is actually alive and living in Mexico and has asked for his son's help. When he arrives in Mexico he finds that his father has died under mysterious circumstances. Determining that his father has met with foul play, he uses "the sign of Zorro", to lead a campaign against a corrupt generalissimo. Along the way he wins the heart of a beautiful senorita.

Cast

Production
The film's original title was, Il Segno di Zorro which translates as "The Sign of Zorro". To avoid copyright issues,(Disney had released a compilation film of their TV series with the title, Sign of Zorro (1960)), Harry Joe Brown released the film under the less Zorro sounding title of "Duel at the Rio Grande" and had removed from the film almost any mention of Zorro.

Nathan Juran may have worked on the US release. In the English print credits, the director is listed as N. Juran.

References

External links

1963 films
1963 Western (genre) films
Italian Western (genre) films
French Western (genre) films
Spanish Western (genre) films
English-language French films
English-language Italian films
English-language Spanish films
Films directed by Mario Caiano
Films based on works by Johnston McCulley
1960s English-language films
1960s Italian films